Cirilo Cánovas García (9 July 1899 – 25 January 1973) was a Spanish politician who served as Minister of Agriculture of Spain between 1957 and 1965, during the Francoist dictatorship.

References

1899 births
1973 deaths
Agriculture ministers of Spain
Government ministers during the Francoist dictatorship